Arula is a village in Otepää Parish, Valga County in southeastern Estonia. It has a population of 65 (as of 7 February 2008).

Arula is the birthplace of poet and author Mats Traat (born 1936).

Gallery

References

Villages in Valga County
Kreis Dorpat